John Fowler Chaplin (10 October 1882 – 15 April 1952) was a Scottish football player and manager. A left back, Chaplin played for Dundee over two spells, winning the Scottish Cup in 1910, and represented the Scottish League. He also played for Tottenham Hotspur and Manchester City in England.

He later managed Huddersfield Town after serving as trainer under Herbert Chapman (formerly his teammate at Tottenham and boss at Leeds City), leading the club to runners-up finishes in the Football League in 1926–27 and 1927–28, and to the 1928 FA Cup Final which they lost to Blackburn Rovers.

His brothers were fellow professional players George Chaplin and Alex Chaplin.

References

Sources

1882 births
1952 deaths
Scottish footballers
Scottish football managers
Footballers from Dundee
Huddersfield Town A.F.C. managers
Dundee F.C. players
Tottenham Hotspur F.C. players
Dundee Wanderers F.C. players
Manchester City F.C. players
Leeds United F.C. non-playing staff
Bristol Rovers F.C. non-playing staff
Sheffield Wednesday F.C. non-playing staff
Huddersfield Town A.F.C. non-playing staff
Scottish Junior Football Association players
Scottish Football League players
Southern Football League players
English Football League players
English Football League managers
Scottish Football League representative players
Association football defenders
Association football coaches